David (Dafydd) Daron was the Dean of Bangor (1397 - 1410). His father was Evan ap David ap Griffith, a descendant of Caradoc ap Iestyn.

Daron appears as the Archdeacon of Bangor in William Shakespeare's works on Henry IV. The meeting between Owain Glyndŵr, Hotspur, Worcester and Mortimer regarding the Tripartite Indenture took place in his home.

References 

Deans of Bangor
14th-century Welsh Roman Catholic priests
15th-century Welsh Roman Catholic priests